Thriamvos Patras (Greek: ΑΟ Θρίαμβος Πατρών) was founded in 1991 and had athletic clubs including water polo, swimming, synchronized diving, basketball, chess and ping pong.

In 2001, its dodgeball club united with Foinikas Patras and changed its name to AS Ormi Patras, the polo and swimming dissolved in 2006 and OPATHA and it became NE Patras.

Achievements

Badminton
Second Division Championships: 1
2005

Water Polo
Male:
Second Division Championships: 3
1989, 1992
Third Division Championships: 2
1983, 1985

References

Patras Press Museum
Newspapers: Peloponnisos, I Imera, I Gnomi, Patra Spor, Neologos, Patraiki Evdomas
The first version of the article is translated from the article at the Greek Wikipedia (Main page)

Sports clubs established in 1981
Defunct sports teams in Greece
Multi-sport clubs in Greece